The Old Palm Beach Junior College Building (also known as the Science/Manual Training Building at Old Palm Beach High School) is a historic site in West Palm Beach, Florida. It is located at 813 Gardenia Avenue. On May 30, 1991, it was added to the U.S. National Register of Historic Places. It is located on the campus of the Dreyfoos School of the Arts.

References

External links
 Palm Beach County listings at National Register of Historic Places
 Florida's Office of Cultural and Historical Programs
 Palm Beach County listings
 Palm Beach County markers

National Register of Historic Places in Palm Beach County, Florida